In American English, a pitcher is a container with a spout used for storing and pouring liquids. In English-speaking countries outside North America, a jug is any container with a handle and a mouth and spout for liquid – American "pitchers" will be called jugs elsewhere.  Generally a pitcher also has a handle, which makes pouring easier. 

Ewer is an older word for a pitcher or jug of any type, though tending to be used for a vase-shaped pitcher, often decorated, with a base and a flaring spout. The word is now unusual in informal English describing ordinary domestic vessels. A notable ewer is the America's Cup, which is awarded to the winning team of the America's Cup sailing regatta match.

In modern British English, the only use of "pitcher" is when beer is sold by the pitcher in bars and restaurants, following the American style.

Etymology 
The word pitcher comes from the 13th-century Middle English word picher, which means earthen jug. The word picher is linked to the Old French word pichier, which is the altered version of the word bichier, meaning drinking cup. 

The word's origin goes as far back to the Medieval Latin word  from the Greek word βῖκος : bîkos, which meant earthen vessel. Compare with Dutch beker, German Becher, English  and Italian .

Ancient examples 
In the typology of Greek vase shapes jug or pitcher shapes include various types of oenochoe, and the olpe. 

An early mention of a pitcher occurs in the Book of Genesis, when Rebekah comes to Abraham's servant bearing a vessel with water. In the Book of Judges, Gideon gives empty pitchers containing lamps to three hundred men divided into three companies. In the gospels of Mark and Luke, Jesus tells two of his disciples to go into the city of Jerusalem, where they will meet a man carrying a pitcher of water (Greek: κεράμιον ὕδατος : kerámion hydatos), and instructs them to follow him to locate the upper room to be used for the Last Supper.

The pitcher of Marwan Ibn Mohammad, on display at the Museum of Islamic Art in Cairo, predates the 8th century.

During the Tang dynasty, ewers fashioned from glazed earthenware bore illustrations of Persian textiles and metalwork and depicted increased cultural diversity in populated Chinese cities. Once coveted by the upper classes, ewers eventually became commonplace.

Idiomatic usage 
The proverb "little pitchers have big ears" cautions adults that children are not always as naïve as they seem.

Gallery

See also 
 Amphora
 Aquamanile
 Ashtamangala (symbolism of pitcher like object in Indian religions)
 Bridge spouted vessel
 Creamer (vessel)
 Hydria
 Jar
 Jug (container)
 Obdasta
 Oenochoe
 Porron

References 

Storage vessels
Glass containers
Beer vessels and serving
Pottery shapes
Liquid containers

fr:Pichet